Marvin Leon St.Clair Robinson (born 11 April 1980) is an English former professional footballer who is the assistant manager of Hednesford Town.

Career
Robinson was born in Crewe, and went to school at Wolverhampton Grammar School from 1991 to 1998. While there, he represented England U18 schoolboys. He signed professional terms with Premier League side Derby County in June 1998 and made his debut against Arsenal at Highbury in April 1999. Later that year, he made his full league debut against Manchester United in a 2–1 defeat.

In September 2000, Robinson joined Stoke City on loan for the 2000–01 season. He scored on his debut in a 4–0 win over Oxford United, and played the full match in a 1–1 draw with Port Vale in the Potteries derby. However, in his third match, against Rotherham United, he collided with Rotherham goalkeeper Ian Gray and suffered a broken leg.

In 2002 Robinson returned from injury to score against Sunderland in the 2001–02 season. After spending time out on loan at Tranmere Rovers, scoring once against QPR, Robinson began to forge a career typical of 'journeyman' players, moving from club to club regularly. He had short spells with Chesterfield, Notts County, Rushden & Diamonds (where he scored on his debut in the FA Cup against Bradford City), Walsall, Stockport County, Lincoln City and Macclesfield Town before signing for Oxford United in September 2006.

At Oxford, Robinson was given many opportunities to prove himself, but suffered a loss of form and failed to make a positive impression at the club. In September 2007, he went out on loan to Cambridge United. On 14 October 2007, while on loan to Cambridge United, Robinson suffered a broken leg and bruised lungs in a car crash. As a result of this, Oxford United terminated his loan with Cambridge so he could recover at Oxford. To aid his recovery, Robinson began training with Kettering Town and appeared for the club in a 5–1 Northants Hillier Senior Cup defeat at Daventry Town on 11 November 2008, the Kettering goal coming courtesy of their chairman Imraan Ladak. After a second, and final, appearance for the club in a 3–2 Conference League Cup defeat to A.F.C. Telford United on 20 January 2009, he joined Redditch United. After making his debut for the club in a 4–0 home defeat to Droylsden on 24 January 2009, he scored his first goal for the club in the following Saturday's game, a 2–1 victory at Hyde United.

Robinson started the 2009–2010 season with Massey Ferguson, netting 13 goals in the Midland Combination Premier Division before signing for Northern Premier League side Nantwich Town in December 2009 on a free transfer. He scored 9 goals in his first 9 league and cup games for Nantwich, finishing the season with a total of 11 goals.

In October 2010, he joined Hednesford Town, making his debut for the Pitmen in the 2–1 FA Trophy defeat against Whitby Town at Keys Park on 16 October 2010. On his second appearance for the club, he scored four goals in the club's record 9–0 win over Weymouth.

Robinson moved to Brackley Town in the summer of 2012, and scored 4 goals in 35 appearances for the club in a year-long stint which also included a loan at Leamington early in 2013, before joining Oxford City in 2013.

His time at Oxford City was short; Robinson scored 1 goal in 7 appearances, before returning to Hednesford Town late in 2013. In November 2015 he moved on to join Stafford Rangers, debuting as a substitute in the club's Northern Premier League Division One South 2–0 victory at Loughborough Dynamo on 21 November 2015. In January 2016 he joined Stafford Town on loan, scoring both on his debut in the club's 2–1 home Midland Football League League One victory against Atherstone Town on 23 January 2016 and in his second, and final, match for the club: a 1–1 draw at home to Pilkington XXX one week later. He moved on to join Sporting Khalsa on loan, making his first appearance for the club in their 1–3 home loss to Heanor Town on 13 February 2016. He returned to Hednesford Town on a permanent basis from Stafford Rangers in March 2016, making his latest debut for the club as a late substitute in the 2–2 draw at Gloucester City on 5 March 2016. He joined A.F.C. Wulfrunians for the 2016–17 season, scoring twice on his debut in the 2-0 Midland League Premier Division victory at home to Boldmere St. Michaels on 13 August 2016. He played 16 times for the club scoring five times, 11 times in the league with four goals, before returning to Hednesford Town as First Team Coach in February 2017. In March, the club appointed Gary Birch to the manager role on a permanent basis, with Robinson appointed his assistant.

Career statistics

References

External links
 
 Lincoln City F.C. Official Archive Profile
 Unofficial Marvin Robinson Profile at The Forgotten Imp

1980 births
Living people
Sportspeople from Crewe
English footballers
Association football forwards
Derby County F.C. players
Stoke City F.C. players
Tranmere Rovers F.C. players
Chesterfield F.C. players
Notts County F.C. players
Rushden & Diamonds F.C. players
Walsall F.C. players
Stockport County F.C. players
Lincoln City F.C. players
Macclesfield Town F.C. players
Oxford United F.C. players
Cambridge United F.C. players
Kettering Town F.C. players
Redditch United F.C. players
Nantwich Town F.C. players
Hednesford Town F.C. players
Brackley Town F.C. players
Leamington F.C. players
Oxford City F.C. players
Stafford Rangers F.C. players
Sporting Khalsa F.C. players
English Football League players
National League (English football) players
Premier League players